Bandy Island is a small ice-covered island lying in Hull Bay,  west of Lynch Point in coastal Marie Byrd Land. It was mapped by the United States Geological Survey from surveys and from U.S. Navy aerial photographs, 1962–67, and named by the Advisory Committee on Antarctic Names after Orville L. Bandy (1917–73), professor of geology at the University of California, Los Angeles, and a participant since 1961 in several United States Antarctic Research Program projects. In 1964 and 1966, respectively, he was chief scientist on cruises 7 and 17 of RV Anton Bruun, and took part in several cruises of USNS Eltanin.

See also 
 List of Antarctic and sub-Antarctic islands

References 

Islands of Marie Byrd Land